The John and Elizabeth Kinsman House is a historic house near Milwaukie, Oregon, United States. Completed in 1964, it is a locally significant and almost unaltered example of the Contemporary Style of the late 1950s and early 1960s, which emphasized local materials and indoor-outdoor living and rejected continuity with earlier stylistic conventions. The house is set in landscaped grounds that are also unaltered from the historic period. Designer/builder John Kinsman built the house for himself and his wife Elizabeth using design elements characteristic of the mid-century period that he had also employed on his other projects.

The house was entered on the National Register of Historic Places in 2021.

See also
National Register of Historic Places listings in Clackamas County, Oregon
Mid-century modern

References

External links
Oregon Historic Sites Database entry

Houses on the National Register of Historic Places in Oregon
National Register of Historic Places in Clackamas County, Oregon
Milwaukie, Oregon
Houses completed in 1964
1964 establishments in Oregon
Modernist architecture in Oregon